KwaMhlanga is a fast growing town in the North Western corner of Mpumalanga province in South Africa. It is the spiritual home of the Ndebele tribe that settled here in the early 18th century. Kwamhlanga now consists of Kwamhlanga, Mandela, Phola, Sun City, Lithuli, Jordan, Mountain View, eMpumelelweni Village, Kingspark Village and Tweefontein.

KwaMhlanga is 73 km or an hour's drive from the country’s capital, Pretoria on the R573 road.

This town developed into the administrative centre for the local government, and now houses the government administration for the North Western Region of the Mpumalanga Province.

To the north of KwaMhlanga, on the R568 road near the village of Klipfontein, is located the Manala Royal Kraal; the Ndzundza Mabhoko Royal Kraal is situated further north at Weltevreden. By special arrangement, both of these kraals can be visited by small groups.

Sport
National First Division side Casric Stars are based in KwaMhlanga, playing their home games at the Solomon Mahlangu Stadium.

See also
KwaNdebele
Siyabuswa
Vaalbank

References

Populated places in the Thembisile Hani Local Municipality